Antaeotricha iopetra is a moth in the family Depressariidae. It was described by Edward Meyrick in 1932. It is found in Guatemala.

The wingspan is about 24 mm. The hindwings are dark grey.

References

Moths described in 1932
iopetra
Taxa named by Edward Meyrick
Moths of Central America